Two Angels and a Sinner (Spanish:Dos ángeles y un pecador) is a 1945 Argentine comedy drama film directed by Luis César Amadori and starring Zully Moreno, Pedro López Lagar and Fanny Navarro. The film's sets were designed by art director Mario Vanarelli.

Cast
 Zully Moreno
 Pedro López Lagar
 Fanny Navarro
 Florindo Ferrario
 Liana Moabro
 Miriam Sucre
 Adriana Alcock
 José A. Paonessa
 Roberto Bordoni
 Nora Loubet
 Margarita Burke
 Leda Urbi
 Warly Ceriani

External links
 

1945 films
1945 comedy-drama films
1940s Spanish-language films
Argentine black-and-white films
Films directed by Luis César Amadori
Argentine comedy-drama films
1940s Argentine films